Ioannis Liritzis  (Greek: Ιωάννης Λυριντζής; born 2 November 1953) is professor of physics in archaeology (archaeometry) and his field of specialization is the application of natural sciences to archaeology and cultural heritage. He studied physics at the University of Patras and continued at the University of Edinburgh, where he obtained  his Ph.D. in 1980. Since then, he undertook postgraduate work at the University of Oxford,  Université Bordeaux III, University of Edinburgh and the Academy of Athens.

Currently he is distinguished professor of archaeometry-Natural Sciences at the Henan University, Kaifeng, China  and was professor in Archaeometry & Natural Sciences at the University of the Aegean and he directed and founded the Laboratory of Archaeometry (founded by him at 1999) and Lab of Environmental Archaeology. Director and initiator of the Masters course Applied Archaeological Sciences. In the past he served as Head of the Department of Mediterranean Studies at the University of the Aegean, Member of the Senate of University of the Aegean and Member of the  Executive Committee of National Recognition of Foreign Academic Diplomas. His prior career includes the Greek Ministry of Culture for 5 years (1984–1989) and the Academy of Athens for 10 years (1989–1999).

He has made major contributions to several  interdisciplinary research fields (geophysics, astronomy, planetology, paleomagnetism, paleoclimatology) and his work has been published in scientific journals such as Nature.

Work
Liritzis is best known for the invention of two novel dating methods. The method for surface luminescence dating (introduced at 1994) where Liritzis extended the principles behind optical dating and thermoluminescence dating to include surfaces last seen by the sun before buried, of carved rock types from ancient monuments and artifacts, made of granite, basalt and sandstone and the obsidian hydration dating (introduced at 2002). This Liritzis' luminescence method has been improved and extended to other stone surfaces by other scientists.  
Obsidian hydration dating established a new approach based on the surface saturation layer and the SIMS profile of hydrogen (SIMS-SS method). This SIMS-SS method has been improved by Liritzis and his PhD students to include criteria of the suitability of obsidian surfaces for dating.

Significant contributions in archaeoastronomy, in geophysics (archaeomagnetism, statistics in earthquakes, nuclear geophysics ) are also worth mentioning.

Initiator of Delphi4Delphi International Project.

He has written over 300 original papers in internationally cited journals and 9 books (4 in English).

Many Greek and international magazines and newspapers have referred to his work, as has the Discovery Channel.

Liritzis has been elected as Membre Correspondant de l'Académie des Sciences, Arts et Belles-Lettres de Dijon and Member of the  EASAEuropean Academy of Sciences and Arts, while since Jan 2021 is Dean of Class IV Natural Sciences in EASA https://euro-acad.eu/governance-legalacts. He was awarded the Prize  of Academy of Athens for his Book Archaeometry: Dating Methods in Archaeology (1986). Recently he was awarded the Costa Navarino International Archeometry Award (2010) Issued by the University of Peloponesse. He is Visiting Distinguished Professor at Henan University (China) Visiting Scholar at the University of California San Diego. He has been awarded the title of Honorary Fellow from the Edinburgh University, Scotland; Honorary Professor at Rhodes University, Dept of Physics & Electronics, South Africa; Honorary & Gusr Professor at the Samara State Institute of Culture, Russia.

Liritzis is an editorial member in more than thirty International ICI Journals and is Editor-in-Chief of two.

He is the PI and initiator and coordinates the Aegean University Archaeological excavation project in Delphi & Kastrouli, regarding the Late Mycenaean site near Delphi, Greece.

The archaeology and history of Egypt (Egyptology)  was first officially introduced in Greek university curricula in the Department of Mediterranean Studies (DMS) of the University of the Aegean. It was back in 1999 and the bright vision of  Prof. Ioannis Liritzis approved by Temporary Academic Committee of the DMS, that  Egyptology was inauguratedan as an academic discipline in Greek academia. Prof. Ioannis Liritzis established the Chair and in 2003, and managed the appointment of the first lecturer in Egyptology. Since 1998 official  contacts between the Department of Mediterranean Studies essentially formed by Prof Liritzis, and the Egyptian authorities,  were encouraged in research, fieldwork and education, through Greek and European funding. Through Prof Liritzis the Hellenic-Egyptian relationship in Egyptological studies in University curricula took off and has since then credited in plethora of publications and interactions. Prof. Liritzis has initiated many projects and Protocols of Collaboration (MOU) between Egyptian Universities and the University of the Aegean. The HERITAGE journal has published an Honorary Volume upon Liritzi's retirement, highlighting his major contributions and establishment of the Egyptology chair in Greece, and his collaboration with Egyptian researchers on the study of cultural heritage in Egypt, with three internationally renowned Guest Editors.

Articles (selection) 
 
Liritzis, I, P. Volonakis, S. Vosinakis, G. Pavlidis.G (2015) Cyber-archaeometry from Cyber-archaeology:  New dynamic trends in archaeometric training  and research. In Virtual Archaeology (Methods and Benefits), Daria Hokk (ed), Proceedings of the Second International Conference held at the State Hermitage Museum 1–3 June 2015 Saint Petersburg The State Hermitage Publishers, 38-40

 
Liritzis, I, Panagiota Preka-Papadema, Panagiotis Antonopoulos, Konstantinos Kalachanis and  Chris G.Tzanis (2017) Does astronomical and geographical information of Plutarch's De Facie describe a trip beyond the north Atlantic ocean?. Journal of Coastal Research, 34, 3, 651-674 https://doi.org/10.2112/JCOASTRES-D-17-00105.1

Thomas E. Levy, T. Sideris, M. Howland, B. Liss, G. Tsokas, A. Stambolidis, E. Fikos, G. Vargemezis, P. Tsourlos, A. Georgopoulos, G. Papatheodorou, M. Garaga, D. Christodoulou, R. Norris, I. Rivera-Collazo, and I. Liritzis (2018) At-Risk World Heritage, Cyber, and Marine Archaeology: The Kastrouli–Antikyra Bay Land and Sea Project, Phokis, Greece. In T.E. Levy, I.W.N. Jones (eds.), Cyber-Archaeology and Grand Narratives, One World Archaeology, Springer International Publishing AG (DOI 10.1007/978-3-319-65693-9_9 Chapter 9. 143-230).
Liritzis, I, George Pavlidis, Spyros Vosinakis, Anestis Koutsoudis, Pantelis Volonakis, Matthew D. Howland, Brady Liss, Thomas E. Levy (2017) Delphi4Delphi - Acquisition of Spatial Cultural Heritage Data for Ancient Delphi, Greece. Ιn Matthew Vincent, Victor Manuel Lopez-Menchero Bendicho, Marinos Ioannides and Thomas E. Levy (editors) Heritage and Archaeology in the Digital Age: Acquisition, Curation, and Dissemination of Spatial Cultural Heritage Data. Publisher: Springer, 151-166.

References

External links 
 Home page at University of the Aegean
www.liritzis.gr

1953 births
Living people
University of Patras alumni
Alumni of the University of Edinburgh
Academic staff of the University of the Aegean
Greek archaeologists
21st-century Greek physicists
Members of the European Academy of Sciences and Arts
People from Phocis